Richard Matthewson Keith (15 May 1933 – 28 February 1967) was a professional footballer from Northern Ireland who played as a right-back. He made over 200 appearances for English club Newcastle United between 1956 and 1964, and also played for Linfield, Bournemouth & Boscombe Athletic and Weymouth, and was a member of the Northern Ireland squad at the 1958 World Cup.

Playing career

Club
Keith was born in Belfast on 15 May 1933 and began his career in the Irish League with Linfield. He won the Irish Cup with Linfield in 1953 and was named Ulster Footballer of the Year in 1956. He was transferred to Newcastle United in September 1956, where he went on to make 208 Football League appearances and became captain in 1962. He joined Bournemouth & Boscombe Athletic in February 1964 and later joined non-League club Weymouth.

International
Keith made 23 appearances for Northern Ireland between 1957 and 1962, and was part of the squad that reached the quarter-finals of the 1958 World Cup. He also played for the Northern Ireland B team and the Irish League representative team.

Death
Keith died in Bournemouth on 28 February 1967 as a result of an accident at a builder's yard, when an automatic garage door he was dismantling collapsed on top of him. He was aged 33 and still playing for Weymouth at the time.

References

Sources

1933 births
1967 deaths
Newcastle United F.C. players
AFC Bournemouth players
Linfield F.C. players
Association footballers from Northern Ireland
Northern Ireland international footballers
NIFL Premiership players
1958 FIFA World Cup players
Association footballers from Belfast
Ulster Footballers of the Year
Industrial accident deaths
Accidental deaths in England
Irish League representative players
Northern Ireland B international footballers
Association football defenders